The Prix Goncourt (The Goncourt Prize) is a prize in French literature, given by the académie Goncourt to the author of "the best and most imaginative prose work of the year". The prize carries a symbolic reward of only 10 euros, but results in considerable recognition and book sales for the winning author. Four other prizes are also awarded: prix Goncourt du Premier Roman (first novel), prix Goncourt de la Nouvelle (short story), prix Goncourt de la Poésie (poetry) and prix Goncourt de la Biographie (biography). Of the "big six" French literary awards, the Prix Goncourt is the best known and most prestigious. The other major literary prizes include the Grand Prix du roman de l'Académie française, the Prix Femina, the Prix Renaudot, the Prix Interallié and the Prix Médicis.

History

Edmond de Goncourt, a successful author, critic, and publisher, bequeathed his estate for the foundation and maintenance of the Académie Goncourt. In honour of his brother and collaborator, Jules Alfred Huot de Goncourt (1830–1870), the académie has awarded the Prix Goncourt every December since 1903. The jury that determines the winner meets at the Drouant restaurant in November to make its decision. Notable winners of the prize include Marcel Proust (In Search of Lost Time), Simone de Beauvoir (The Mandarins), André Malraux (Man's Fate) and Marguerite Duras (The Lover).

The award was initially established to provide talented new authors with a monetary award that would allow them to write a second book. Today, the Goncourt has a token prize amount (around 10 euros), about the same amount given in 1903, and so the prestige of the prize has been explained not because of the cash-value of the prize, but "in terms of the tremendous book sales it effects: the Goncourt winner becomes an instant millionaire." Hervé Le Tellier's The Anomaly, which won the Goncourt in 2020, exceeded a million copies in less than a year after its publication.

In 1987, the Prix Goncourt des Lycéens was established, as a collaboration between the académie Goncourt, the French Ministry of Education, and Fnac, a book, music, and movie retailer.

The Prix Renaudot is announced at the same ceremony as the Prix Goncourt. It has become known as something of a second-place prize.

Controversies

Within months of the first prize in 1903, it spawned a "hostile counter-prize" in the form of the Prix Femina to counter the all-male Jury of the Goncourt with an all-female jury on the Femina.

Some decisions for awarding the prize have been controversial, a famous case being the decision to award the prize in 1919 to Marcel Proust; this was met with indignation, since many in the public felt that the prize should have gone to Roland Dorgelès for Les Croix de bois, a novel about the First World War. The prize was supposed to be awarded to promising young authors, whereas Proust was not considered "young" at 48 – however Proust was a beginning author which is the only eligibility requirement, age being unimportant.

In 1921, Rene Maran won the Goncourt with Batouala, veritable roman negre, the first French novel to openly criticize European colonialism in Africa. The novel caused "violent reactions" and was banned in all the French colonies.

In 1932, the prize was controversial for passing up Louis-Ferdinand Céline's Voyage au bout de la nuit for Guy Mazeline's Les Loups. The voting process became the basis of the 1992 book Goncourt 32 by Eugène Saccomano.

Although the award may only be given to an author once, Romain Gary won it twice, in 1956 for Les racines du ciel and again under the pseudonym Émile Ajar in 1975 for La vie devant soi. The Académie Goncourt awarded the prize to Ajar without knowing his real identity. A period of literary intrigue followed. Gary's cousin's son Paul Pavlowitch posed as the author for a time. Gary later revealed the truth in his posthumous book Vie et mort d'Émile Ajar.

In September 2021, the Goncourt attracted controversy after the jury decided, by a vote of 7 to 3, to include Les enfants de Cadillac by François Noudelmann on its 2021 list of finalists. Noudelmann is the partner of Camille Laurens, who is a member of the prize's jury. Laurens voted in favor of her partner's book. In October 2021, the Académie Goncourt ultimately decided that it will no longer allow lovers and family members of the jury to be entered for consideration.

Selection and voting process 
The Prix Goncourt is divided into three selection stages. The first selection is typically composed of fifteen finalists. The second selection is typically composed of eight finalists, narrowed down from the previous fifteen. A third and final selection leaves four finalists.

In the voting rounds, a maximum of fourteen rounds can be carried out. To begin the deliberation process, the names of the four finalists are placed in a champagne bucket. In turn, the names are taken out and each member of the jury votes aloud in favour of, or in opposition to, the writer. An absolute majority—more than half the votes cast—is required until the tenth round, then a simple majority is sufficient to designate a winner. If, after fourteen rounds, there is no winner, the president's vote counts as double to determine a majority vote. At 12:45p.m., the Secretary General, Philippe Claudel, appears in front of the crowd of journalists and announces the winner. The winner typically waits in a cafe near the Drouant so that they can arrive in time. The winner is interviewed by the media and is offered a symbolic check for ten euros.

Winners

Other awards
In addition to the Prix Goncourt for a novel, the Academy Awards four other awards, for first novel, short story, biography and poetry.

As of March 2009, the académie changed the award name by dropping "bourses" ("scholarship") from the title. The prefix "prix" can be included or not, such as "Prix Goncourt de la Poésie" (Goncourt prize for Poetry) or "Goncourt de la Poésie" (Goncourt of Poetry). For example: "Claude Vigée was awarded a Goncourt de la Poésie in 2008". Or, "Claude Vigée won the 2008 prix Goncourt de la Poésie".

The award titles are:

The winners are listed below.

Prix Goncourt de la Biographie
Goncourt Prize for biography. Awarded in partnership with the city of Nancy.

1980 – Jean Lacouture, François Mauriac
1981 – Hubert Juin, Victor Hugo 
1982 – Pierre Sipriot, René Depestre
1983 – Ghislain de Diesbach, Madame de Staël
1984 – Jeanne Champion, Suzanne Valadon
1985 – Georges Poisson, Laclos ou l'Obstination 
1986 – Jean Canavaggio, Cervantes
1987 – Michel Surya, Georges Bataille, la mort à l'œuvre
1988 – Frédéric Vitoux, La Vie de Louis-Ferdinand Céline 
1989 – Joanna Richardson, Judith Gautier 
1990 – Pierre Citron, Giono
1991 – Odette Joyeux, Le Troisième œil, la vie de Nicéphore Niepce
1992 – Philippe Beaussant, Lully
1993 – Jean Bothorel, Louise de Vilmorin
1994 – David Bellos, Georges Perec
1995 – Henry Gidel, Les Deux Guitry 
1996 – Anka Muhlstein, Astolphe de Custine
1997 – Jean-Claude Lamy, Prévert, les frères
1998 – Christian Liger, Le Roman de Rossel 
1999 – Claude Pichois and Alain Brunet, Colette
2000 – Dominique Bona, Berthe Morisot
2001 – Laure Murat, La maison du docteur Blanche
2002 – Jean-Paul Goujon, Une Vie Secrète (1870–1925); Mille lettres de Pierre Louÿs à Georges Louis (1890–1917)
2003 – Pierre Billard, Louis Malle
2004 – Claude Dufresne, Appelez-moi George Sand
2005 – Thibaut d'Anthonay, Jean Lorrain
2006 – Angie David, Dominique Aury
2007 – Patrice Locmant, Huysmans, le forçat de la vie
2008 – Jennifer Lesieur, Jack London
2009 – Viviane Forrester, Virginia Woolf
2010 – Michel Winock, Madame de Stael
2011 – Maurizio Serra, Malaparte, vies et légendes
2012 – David Haziot, Le Roman des Rouart
2013 – Pascal Mérigeau, Jean Renoir
2014 – Jean Lebrun, Notre Chanel
2015 – Jean-Christophe Attias, Moïse fragile
2016 – Philippe Forest, Aragon
2017 – Marianne and Claude Schopp, Dumas fils ou l'Anti-Œdipe
2018 – Denis Demonpion, Salinger intime
2019 – Frédéric Pajak, Manifeste incertain, volume 7: Emily Dickinson, Marina Tsvetaïeva, l'immense poésie
2021 – Pauline Dreyfous, Paul Morand

Prix Goncourt de la Nouvelle
Goncourt Prize for short stories. Begun in 1974 in the form of scholarships. Awarded in partnership with the city of Strasbourg since 2001.

1974 – Daniel Boulanger, Fouette, cocher !
1975 – S. Corinna Bille, La Demoiselle sauvage
1976 – Antoine Blondin, Quat'saisons
1977 – Henri Gougaud, Départements et territoires d'outre-mort
1978 – Christiane Baroche, Chambres, avec vue sur le passé
1979 – Andrée Chedid, Le Corps et le Temps
1980 – Guy Lagorce, Les Héroïques
1981 – Annie Saumont, Quelquefois dans les cérémonies
1982 – René Depestre, Alléluia pour une femme-jardin
1983 – Raymond Jean, Un fantasme de Bella B.
1984 – Alain Gerber, Les Jours de vin et de roses
1985 – Pierrette Fleutiaux, Métamorphoses de la reine
1986 – Jean Vautrin, Baby-boom
1987 – Noëlle Châtelet, Histoires de bouche
1988 – Jean-Louis Hue, Dernières Nouvelles du Père Noël
1989 – Paul Fournel, Les Athlètes dans leur tête
1990 – Jacques Bens, Nouvelles désenchantées
1991 – Rafaël Pividal, Le Goût de la catastrophe
1992 – Catherine Lépront, Trois gardiennes
1993 – Mariette Condroyer, Un après-midi plutôt gai
1994 – Jean-Christophe Duchon-Doris, Les Lettres du baron
1996 – Ludovic Janvier, En mémoire du lit
1997 – François Sureau, Le Sphinx de Darwin
1999 – Elvire de Brissac, Les anges d'en bas
2000 – Catherine Paysan, Les Désarmés
2001 – Stéphane Denis, Elle a maigri pour le festival
2002 – Sébastien Lapaque, Mythologie Française
2003 – Philippe Claudel, Les petites mécaniques
2004 – Olivier Adam, Passer l'hiver
2005 – Georges-Olivier Châteaureynaud, Singe savant tabassé par deux clowns
2006 – Franz Bartelt, Le Bar des habitudes
2007 – Brigitte Giraud, L'Amour est très surestimé
2008 – Jean-Yves Masson, Ultimes vérités sur la mort du nageur
2009 – Sylvain Tesson, Une vie à coucher dehors
2010 – Éric-Emmanuel Schmitt, Concerto à la mémoire d'un ange
2011 – Bernard Comment, Tout passe
2012 – Didier Daeninckx, L'Espoir en contrebande
2013 – Fouad Laroui, L'Étrange Affaire du pantalon de Dassoukine
2014 – Nicolas Cavaillès, Vie de monsieur Leguat
2015 – Patrice Franceschi, Première personne du singulier
2016 – Marie-Hélène Lafon, Histoires
2017 – Raphaël Haroche, Retourner à la mer
2018 – Régis Jauffret, Microfictions 2018
2019 – Caroline Lamarche, Nous sommes à la lisière
2020 – Anne Serre, Au cœur d'un été tout en or
2021 – Shmuel T. Meyer, Et la guerre est finie...

Prix Goncourt du Premier Roman
Goncourt Prize for debut novel. Awarded in partnership with the municipality of Paris.

 1990 – Hélène de Monferrand, Les amies d'Héloïse
 1991 – Armande Gobry-Valle, Iblis ou la défroque du serpent
 1992 – Nita Rousseau, Les iris bleus
 1993 – Bernard Chambaz, L'arbre de vies
 1994 – Bernard Lamarche-Vadel, Vétérinaires
 1995 – Florence Seyvos, Les apparitions
 1996 – Yann Moix, Jubilations vers le ciel
 1997 – Jean-Christophe Rufin, L'abyssin
 1998 – Shan Sa, Porte de la paix céleste
 1999 – Nicolas Michel, Un revenant
 2000 – Benjamin Berton, Sauvageons
 2001 – Salim Bachi, Le chien d'Ulysse
 2002 – Soazig Aaron, Le non-de Klara
 2003 – Claire Delannoy, La guerre, l'Amérique
 2004 – Françoise Dorner, La fille du rang derrière
 2005 – Alain Jaubert, Val Paradis
 2006 – Hédi Kaddour, Waltenberg
 2007 – Frédéric Brun, Perla
 2008 – Jakuta Alikavazovic, Corps volatils
 2009 – Jean-Baptiste Del Amo, Une éducation libertine
 2010 – Laurent Binet, HHhH
 2011 – Michel Rostain, Le Fils
 2012 – François Garde, Ce qu'il advint du sauvage blanc
 2013 – Alexandre Postel, Un homme effacé
 2014 – Frédéric Verger, Arden
 2015 – Kamel Daoud, The Meursault Investigation
 2016 – Joseph Andras, . Author declined the prize.
 2017 – Maryam Madjidi, Marx et la poupée
 2018 – Mahir Guven, Grand frère
 2019 – Marie Gauthier, Court vêtue
 2020 – Maylis Besserie, Le Tiers Temps
 2021 – Émilienne Malfatto, Que sur toi se lamente le Tigre

Prix Goncourt de la Poésie

Goncourt Prize for poetry. Established through the bequest of Adrien Bertrand (Prix Goncourt in 1914). The award is for the poet's entire career work.

 1985 – Claude Roy
 1986 – postponed to 1987
 1987 – Yves Bonnefoy
 1988 – Eugène Guillevic
 1989 – Alain Bosquet
 1990 – Charles Le Quintrec
 1991 – Jean-Claude Renard
 1992 – Georges-Emmanuel Clancier
 1993 – not awarded
 1994 – not awarded
 1995 – Lionel Ray
 1996 – André Velter
 1997 – Maurice Chappaz
 1998 – Lorand Gaspar
 1999 – Jacques Réda
 2000 – Liliane Wouters
 2001 – Claude Esteban
 2002 – Andrée Chedid
 2003 – Philippe Jaccottet
 2004 – Jacques Chessex
 2005 – Charles Dobzynski
 2006 – Alain Jouffroy
 2007 – Marc Alyn
 2008 – Claude Vigée
 2009 – Abdellatif Laabi
 2010 – Guy Goffette
 2011 – Vénus Khoury-Ghata
 2012 – Jean-Claude Pirotte
 2013 – Charles Juliet
 2014 – not awarded
 2015 – William Cliff
 2016 – Le Printemps des Poètes
 2017 – Franck Venaille
 2018 – Anise Koltz
 2019 – Yvon Le Men
 2020 – Michel Deguy
 2021 – Jacques Roubaud

Bourse Goncourt Jeunesse
Goncrout Prize for children's literature. Awarded in partnership with the municipality of Fontvieille. Discontinued after 2007.

1999 – Claude Guillot and Fabienne Burckel, Le fantôme de Shanghai
2000 – Eric Battut, Rouge Matou
2002 – Fred Bernard and François Roca, Jeanne and le Mokélé and Jesus Betz
2003 – Yvan Pommaux, Avant la Télé
2004 – Jean Chalon and Martine Delerm, Un arbre dans la lune
2005 – Natali Fortier, Lili Plume
2006 – Bernard du Boucheron and Nicole Claveloux, Un roi, une princesse and une pieuvre
2007 – Véronique Ovaldé and Joëlle Jolivet, La très petite Zébuline

Prix Goncourt des Lycéens

See also
Prix Renaudot – announced at the same ceremony as the Prix Goncourt, it has become something of a second-place prize.
Prix Goncourt des Lycéens
Grand Prix du roman de l'Académie française
List of French literary awards
For a more comprehensive overview a list of literary awards is available.

Notes and references
Notes

References

 
Goncourt
Awards established in 1903
First book awards
Short story awards
Goncourt
Biography awards
1903 establishments in France
Children's literary awards